John Mask Peace House, also known as Bambro Plantation, is a historic plantation house located near Fairport, Granville County, North Carolina.  The house was built about 1840, and is a two-story, three-bay, double-pile, frame building with a low, hipped roof.  It has central hall plan and Greek Revival style design elements.

It was listed on the National Register of Historic Places in 2003.

References

Plantation houses in North Carolina
Houses on the National Register of Historic Places in North Carolina
Greek Revival houses in North Carolina
Houses completed in 1840
Houses in Granville County, North Carolina
National Register of Historic Places in Granville County, North Carolina